Honey Cone was an American R&B and soul girl group formed by lead singer Edna Wright (sister of Darlene Love) with Carolyn Willis and Shelly Clark in 1968. They are best remembered for their number-one Billboard Hot 100 single, "Want Ads". Honey Cone were the premier female group for Hot Wax Records, operated by Holland–Dozier–Holland after they had departed from Motown Records.

Career

Backgrounds
The trio each had previous professional singing experience with various groups and in the studio before forming Honey Cone in 1968.

Edna Wright, a Los Angeles native, grew up singing in the church. Her father, Bishop J.W. Wright, was a pastor at King's Holiness Chapel in Los Angeles. She began her career in a gospel group called The COGIC (Church of God in Christ) singers in 1960. Through her sister, singer Darlene Love, she met producer Phil Spector. Jack Nitzsche, an associate of Spector, produced her first feature recording in 1964. Wright sang lead on "Yes Sir, That's My Baby" by Hale and the Hushabyes which was a pseudonym for a group that included Brian Wilson, Sonny & Cher, Jackie DeShannon. That year she released her debut solo single "A Touch of Venus," which led to a nationwide nightclub tour. Between 1964 and 1967, Wright recorded as Sandy Wynns. She then became a backing vocalist for the Righteous Brothers, Johnny Rivers then for Ray Charles who asked her to join the Raelettes.

Carolyn Willis began singing at the age of 16, she was a member of the girl group the Girlfriends. They released one single, "My One and Only Jimmy Boy" (No. 49 Pop), on Colpix Records in 1963. She also did some session work with Lou Rawls, O.C. Smith, and Bob B. Soxx & the Blue Jeans.  Willis and Wright were also members of Darlene Love's group The Blossoms.

Shelly Clark, a native of Brooklyn, began her career at the young age of six. Along with her older brother. they released an album on Columbia Records titled Calypso Songs For Children (1957). At the age of 7, Clark appeared in the hit Broadway musical House of Flowers. Her family moved to Los Angeles in 1957. Her soprano singing earned her a scholarship to attend the University of Southern California. She later became an Ikette in the Ike & Tina Turner Revue, leaving after she was injured in a bus accident in 1966. Clark also was lead dancer on tour with Little Richard and Dusty Springfield. She became a regular singer and dancer on The Jim Nabors Show in 1969.

Honey Cone
Wright, Willis and Clark first appeared together on an Andy Williams TV special in 1968. Wright's sister Darlene Love was scheduled to appear on the show, but was unable to so she asked Wright to fill in for her. Wright asked Willis and Clark to join her. She also contacted Eddie Holland, who recently left Motown Records along with Brian Holland and Lamont Dozier to form HDH Records, to watch the show.

Impressed by what he saw, Holland signed the trio to Hot Wax Records. Initially, he offered Wright a contract, but she preferred to be in a group. Holland named the act Honey Cone for a favorite flavor of ice cream. At first, group members rejected the name, but Holland prevailed, and the ladies soon embraced its distinctiveness. Although the group was based in Los Angeles, their recordings were recorded in Detroit. Most of their songs were written by General Johnson and Wright's boyfriend at the time Greg Perry.

Martha & the Vandellas and The Marvelettes — two of the female vocal groups who represented Motown Records' sound in the 1960s — were among Honey Cone's main influences as the group favored a blend of sweetness and grit in their own sound.

Honey Cone's debut single "While You're Out Looking for Sugar" was also the first single released on Hot Wax. It peaked at No. 26 on Billboard'''s R&B chart, but the follow-up "Girls, It Ain't Easy," reached No. 8 on the same chart. Their fifth release "Want Ads" proved to be their biggest success, topping both the R&B and pop chart, selling over one million copies, awarded with a gold disc by the R.I.A.A. in May 1971. The trio began headlining their own shows across the US, including at the Apollo Theatre and they performed a series of one-nighters in the South. The same year, Honey Cone had another No. 1 R&B hit and No. 11 pop hit with "Stick-Up," which also sold more than one million units. Honey Cone were named The Best Female Vocal Group by the National Association of Television and Radio Announcers (NATRA) in 1971. Willis' fiancé, promoter Dick Griffey, traveled with them on the road and handled their finances. Further chart success continued in 1972 with "One Monkey Don't Stop No Show" (No. 15 Pop, No. 5 R&B) and "The Day I Found Myself" (No. 23 Pop, No. 8 R&B). However, none of the three of Honey Cone's releases in 1973 sold well. Then, Hot Wax and sister label Invictus Records ran into financial problems reportedly caused by difficulties receiving payments from distributors.

Honey Cone were featured on the cover of Jet on September 2, 1971.

As the vocal arranger for the group, Willis became unhappy with the material they were recording and she left the group in 1973. Honey Cone tried to replace her but the chemistry wasn't coherent so the group split up before 1973 ended. Hot Wax folded soon afterwards under increasing debt. In 1976, Hot Wax tried to revive the label and released a single by Honey Cone with none of the original members.

Post-Honey Cone careers
Wright released a solo album, Oops! Here I Go Again (1977), on RCA. She returned to session work, recording and performing with Annie Lennox, Whitney Houston, Ray Charles, and her sister Darlene Love. In more recent years, Wright performed across the United States with Latari Martin and Melodye Perry, billed as Edna Wright and The Honey Cone. She was married to musician Greg Perry, who co-wrote and produced many of Honey Cone's recordings at Hot Wax, including their two gold records. Wright died on September 12, 2020.

Willis appeared as a featured vocalist on the Seals and Crofts hit "Get Closer," in 1976, and on two tracks from their live album Sudan Village''. She recorded jingles for major companies such as Toyota, American Airlines, and Max Factor. Willis recorded and toured with various artists, including Neil Diamond, Boz Scaggs, and Carly Simon.

Clark has been married to Earth, Wind & Fire bassist Verdine White since 1980. She was previously married to Thad Spencer, a Heavyweight boxer and Honey Cone's former bodyguard. She later worked as a production coordinator and casting director for Eddie Murphy Television. She also formed W&W Management Company which represents celebrities.

The original members of Honey Cone attempted a reunion in the 1990s, but Willis backed out of the project. They reunited in February 2014 on the third sailing of the Soul Train Cruise. Original members, Edna Wright and Shelly Clark White, combined with Wright's daughter Melodye Perry, where they presented two concerts that included their hit songs and they covered Earth, Wind & Fire's, "September", as a tribute to Shelly's marital connection to that band. After Edna Wright's passing in 2020, Shelly Clark White continued the legacy of Honey Cone by joining with singers Wendy Smith Brune' and Kathy Merrick and the three continue to tour and perform the hits of Honey Cone. In 2022 they were the featured artists at The HAL Awards (Heroes and Legends) in Los Angeles California.

Awards
RIAA Certification - On May 14, 1971, Honey Cone were awarded a Gold Record for their single "Want Ads" for sales of one million units.
RIAA Certification - On September 23, 1971, Honey Cone were awarded a Gold Record for their single "Stick Up" for selling a million units.
On September 18, 2016, Honey Cone were honored with the 2016 National Rhythm and Blues Music Society Unsung Heroine Award at their Black Tie Gala, Dinner & Awards Ceremony at the Double Tree by Hilton in Philadelphia, Pennsylvania. Willis, who was not in attendance received an award as well.
On September 24, 2017, Clark along with Wright were honored with the Heroes and Legends Award (HAL) in Music as Honey Cone at The Beverly Hill Hotel in Beverly Hills, California.
On 8, January 2021, Honey Cone was inducted into the Soul Music Hall Of Fame Class of 2020.

Discography

Studio albums

 Album was never released

Compilation albums

Singles

Television and film credits
1968 - The Andy Williams Show - Back-up Singers.
1970 - Soul! (TV Series) 
1971 - Soul Train TV Show, Season 1 | Episode 1.
1971 - American Bandstand (TV Series), Episode #14.49.
1971 - The Tonight Show Starring Johnny Carson.
1972 - The Sonny & Cher Comedy Hour, Episode #2.6.
1972 - American Bandstand (TV Series), Episode #15.32.
1972 - The Merv Griffin Show (TV Series), Season 9 | Episode 82.
1972 - Soul Train TV Show, Season 1 | Episode 17.
1973 - Midnight Special TV Show, Season 1 | Episode 9.
1973 - The Tonight Show Starring Johnny Carson.
1973 - Soul Train TV Show,  Season 2 | Episode 24.
2013 - My Music: '70s & '80s Soul Rewind (TV Movie) - (archive footage).

See also
List of number-one hits (United States)
List of artists who reached number one on the Hot 100 (U.S.)

References

External links
Edna Wright and The Honeycone official website

1968 establishments in California
1973 disestablishments in California
Northern soul musicians
Musical groups established in 1968
Musical groups disestablished in 1973
American disco groups
African-American girl groups
American soul musical groups